The Angel with the Flaming Sword is a 1954 West German drama film directed by Gerhard Lamprecht and starring Gertrud Kückelmann, Martin Benrath and Petra Peters.

The film's sets were designed by the art directors Wolf Englert and Max Mellin.

Cast
 Gertrud Kückelmann as Helga Marein
 Martin Benrath as Jürgen Marein
 Petra Peters as Inge Lennartz
 Maria Wimmer as Gitta Binder
 Heini Göbel as Ernst Faber
 Paul Bildt as Regierungsrat Marein
 Hilde Sessak as Elfriede Marein
 Jan Hendriks as Freddy
 Siegfried Lowitz as Krüger
 Werner Hessenland as Dr. Arlin
 Christian Wilhelm as Ulli
 Monika Franke as Monika - genannt Puppe
 Robert Dietl
 Lucie Englisch
 Ellen Frank
 Auguste Hansen-Kleinmichel
 Maria Krahn
 Carsta Löck
 Karl-Heinz Peters
 Arthur Schröder
 Kai-Siegfried Seefeld
 Ernst Stahl-Nachbaur

References

Bibliography 
 Goble, Alan. The Complete Index to Literary Sources in Film. Walter de Gruyter, 1999.

External links 
 

1954 films
1954 drama films
German drama films
West German films
1950s German-language films
Films directed by Gerhard Lamprecht
Films based on German novels
German black-and-white films
1950s German films